Claudia Voňková, née Anna Gerarda Maria "Claudia" van den Heiligenberg (born 25 March 1985) is a former Dutch footballer who played for Bayern Munich II in the German 2. Bundesliga. She played for the Dutch national team between 2005 and 2016 and won national league and cup titles in the Netherlands.

Club career
Born in Roelofarendsveen, she started playing when she was six years old at the boys youth team of SV Alkmania in Oude Wetering. After being scouted by the Royal Dutch Football Association she moved to Racing Club in Leiderdorp (RCL) and played in the Eerste Klasse, the second division at that time. She was the top scorer of the 2003–04 Eerste Klasse. She then moved to Hoofdklasse (first division) club Ter Leede and won the Dutch League (Hoofdklasse), Dutch Cup and the  Dutch Super Cup in 2006–07.

When the Dutch women's professional league (Eredivisie Vrouwen) was established in 2007, she moved to AZ, winning the Dutch League (Eredivisie) in three consecutive seasons (2007–08, 2008–09 and 2009–10) and the Dutch Cup in 2010–11. During her time at the club, she also played seven matches in the UEFA Women's Champions League scoring twice. The club folded at the end of the 2010–11 season and like most of its players, she moved to the newly formed SC Telstar. She played two seasons at Telstar, the first in the Eredivisie and the second in the newly created BeNe League (a merger between the professional Dutch and Belgian women's football leagues).

In 2013 she joined Ajax with how she won her third Dutch Cup in 2013–14.

In 2015, she moved to the German Bundesliga club USV Jena and played two season at the club before moving to Bayern Munich II of the 2. Bundesliga in 2017.

International career
As a RCL (Racing Club Leiderdorp) player, aged 19 she became part of the Dutch national team set up. She made her debut under coach Vera Pauw on 7 September 2005 in a home friendly 0–2 defeat against Italy in Zwolle.

Selected by coach Vera Pauw to be in the national squad for the UEFA Women's Euro 2009, she played in two of the five Dutch matches in the tournament helping the team reach the semifinals.

In December 2009, then national coach Vera Pauw dropped Van den Heiligenberg and Dyanne Bito from the squad ahead of a match against Belarus. The decision proved controversial and it was reported that the duo were kicked out because they were in a relationship. Pauw angrily dismissed the claims, saying it was an insult to suggest they were excluded because of their relationship.

Van den Heiligenberg and Bito remained together and both were restored to the national team by incoming national coach Roger Reijners in 2010. A 2–0 win over Ireland in August 2010 was Van den Heiligenberg's 50th international cap. She was selected in the Netherlands squad for UEFA Women's Euro 2013 in Sweden.

A knee injury ruled out her chances of selection for the 2015 FIFA Women's World Cup. During the following seasons other injuries kept her out of contention for national team selections, she played one match, on 25 January 2016 against Denmark, her 97th cap and eventually her last, as on 6 July 2017 her international retirement was announced. She scored eight goals for the national team.

International goals
Scores and results list the Netherlands goal tally first.

Personal life
Her mother Mary van der Meer was also a Dutch international footballer who played four matches in the 1970s. She combined working for the Dutch police force and playing football during her time at SC Telstar. In September 2018 Claudia married her partner Lucie Voňková. In March 2021 Lucie announced Claudia's pregnancy on social media.

Honours
Ter Leerde
 Hoofdklasse (1): 2006–07
 Dutch Cup (1): 2006–07
 Dutch Super Cup (1): 2006–07

AZ Alkmaar
 Eredivisie (3): 2007–08, 2008–09, 2009–10
 Dutch Cup (1): 2010–11

Ajax
 Dutch Cup (1): 2013–14

References

External links
Profile at Onsoranje.nl 
Profile  at vrouwenvoetbalnederland.nl 

1985 births
Living people
People from Kaag en Braassem
Dutch women's footballers
Netherlands women's international footballers
Dutch expatriate sportspeople in Germany
Expatriate women's footballers in Germany
Eredivisie (women) players
Frauen-Bundesliga players
AZ Alkmaar (women) players
Telstar (women's football club) players
AFC Ajax (women) players
FF USV Jena players
FC Bayern Munich (women) players
Women's association football defenders
Women's association football midfielders
Dutch LGBT sportspeople
LGBT association football players
Dutch expatriate women's footballers
Ter Leede players
21st-century LGBT people
Footballers from South Holland